Blue Camel is an album by the Lebanese oud player and composer Rabih Abou-Khalil. The album fuses traditional Arabic music with jazz. It was recorded in 1992 and released on the Enja label.

Reception

The AllMusic review by Kurt Keefner stated "Blue Camel is the pinnacle to date of Lebanese oud player Rabih Abou-Khalil's achievement as a jazzman. In both mood and scope, it can almost be characterized as a new Kind of Blue. Both tense and reflective, it is perfect for listening after midnight ... Blue Camel may not be a perfect album, but it demonstrates better than any other that a fusion between jazz and a musical form from another culture is possible and can work to the advantage of both. Plus, it's just great listening". Metal Reviews said "The album glories in crafting a successful blend of Arabian music and jazz: a very homogeneous and enjoyable fusion with enough shift in mood and method to keep things interesting".

Track listing
All compositions by Rabih Abou-Khalil
 "Sahara" – 8:18
 "Tsarka" – 6:45
 "Ziriab" – 6:49
 "Blue Camel" – 8:20
 "On Time" – 6:19
 "A Night in the Mountains" – 8:37

Personnel
Rabih Abou-Khalil – oud
Kenny Wheeler – flugelhorn, trumpet
Charlie Mariano – alto saxophone
Steve Swallow – bass
Ramesh Shotham – South Indian drums, percussion
Milton Cardona – congas
Nabil Khaiat – frame drums

References

Rabih Abou-Khalil albums
1992 albums
Enja Records albums